is a Japanese footballer who plays as a centre back or a left back for Kyoto Sanga from 2023.

Career
In 2016, when he was in his third year of high school, he was the captain of the Sanfrecce Hiroshima Youth and played an active role as a central player in the three-back team.

While contributing to winning the Prince Takamado Trophy U-18 Soccer League Premier League WEST, on the other hand, he spent a lot of time practicing with the top team as a class 2 registered player (wearing uniform number 38 during the class 2 registration period).On September 1, it was decided that they would be officially promoted to the top team of Sanfrecce Hiroshima from the next season.
Osamu Henry Iyoha joined J1 League club Sanfrecce Hiroshima in 2017. On June 21, he debuted in Emperor's Cup (v Kagoshima United FC).

In 2018, Osamu Henry Iyoha loaned to FC Gifu until 2020.

In 2021, Osamu Henry Iyoha loaned again to Kagoshima United a year contract.

In 2022, Osamu Henry Iyoha loaned again to J2 promoted club, Roasso Kumamoto a year contract. He leave from the club in 2022 after a season at Kumamoto loan ended.

After departure from Hiroshima. On 21 December 2022, Iyoha announcement officially transfer to J1 club, Kyoto Sanga for upcoming 2023 season.

Personal life
Born in Japan to a Nigerian father and Japanese mother.

Career statistics 
Updated end of the 2022 season.

References

External links
Profile at FC Gifu

1998 births
Living people
Association football people from Aichi Prefecture
People from Kōnan, Aichi
Japanese footballers
Japanese people of Nigerian descent
Sportspeople of Nigerian descent
J1 League players
J2 League players
J3 League players
Sanfrecce Hiroshima players
Kyoto Sanga FC players
Roasso Kumamoto players
Kagoshima United FC players
FC Gifu players
Association football defenders